Tongpu Township, also referred to as Tangpu, is a township in the northeast of the Tibet Autonomous Region, People's Republic of China.

See also
 List of towns and villages in Tibet

References
  
 Includes background information about Tangpu

Township-level divisions of Tibet